This is a list of recording artists who have reached number one on Australia's albums chart from 1965 to the present.

All acts are listed alphabetically.
Solo artists are alphabetised by last name, Groups by group name excluding "A", "An", and "The".
Each act's total of number-one albums is shown after their name.
All artists who are mentioned on the front of the album are listed here
Soundtracks can't be listed as they are listed under various artists

0-9

The Three Tenors (2)
5 Seconds of Summer (5)
The 12th Man (7)
28 Days (1)
50 Cent (1)
1927 (1)
The 1975 (3)
1992 Australian Cast (1)

A

AC/DC (6)
ABBA (5)
Paula Abdul (1)
Bryan Adams (2) 
Adele (3)
Aerosmith (1)
Christina Aguilera (1)
Air Supply (1)
Lily Allen (1)
Herb Alpert (2)
Vanessa Amorosi (1)
The Amity Affliction (4)
Anastacia (1)
The Angels (1)
Aqua (1)
Architects (1)
Arctic Monkeys (3)
Tina Arena (2)
Rick Astley (1)
Audioslave (1)
Australian Crawl (2)
The Avalanches (1)
Avicii (1)

B

The B-52's (1)
Baby Animals (1)
Angelo Badalamenti (1)
Bananarama (1)
Bardot (1)
Jimmy Barnes (15)
Natalie Bassingthwaighte (1)
Beastie Boys (1)
The Beatles (14)
Bee Gees (4)
Justin Bieber (4)
Birds of Tokyo (2)
Birdy (1)
Limp Bizkit (1)
Black Box (1)
The Black Keys (1)
Blondie (1)
Michael Bolton (2)
David Bowie (3)
Boy & Bear (2)
The Black Eyed Peas (3)
James Blunt (2) 
Bliss n Eso (3)
Bob the Builder (1)
Bon Jovi (10)
Bond (1)
Susan Boyle (2)
Daryl Braithwaite (1)
Bring Me the Horizon (4)
Garth Brooks (1)
BTS (3)
Michael Bublé (5)
Jeff Buckley (1)
Bullet For My Valentine (1)
Busby Marou (1)
 Joff Bush (1)

C

Anthony Callea (3)
Mariah Carey (3)
The Carpenters (1)
The Cat Empire (2)
Kasey Chambers (5)
The Chemical Brothers (1)
Cher (1)
Toni Childs (1)
Eric Clapton (1)
Joe Cocker (2)
Cold Chisel (5)
Coldplay (7)
J. Cole (1)
Natalie Cole (1)
Phil Collins (2)
Luke Combs (1)
Bradley Cooper (1)
Matt Corby (1)
The Corrs (2)
Harrison Craig (1)
The Cranberries (2)
Michael Crawford (3)
Cream (2)
Creedence Clearwater Revival (3)
Crosby, Stills, Nash & Young (1)
Sheryl Crow (1)
Crowded House (5)
The Cruel Sea (1)
Cut Copy (1)
The Cure (1)
Culture Club (1)
Paulini (1)
Billy Ray Cyrus (1)
Miley Cyrus (3)

D

D12 (1)
Terence Trent D'Arby (1)
Daddy Cool (1)
Daft Punk (1)
A Day To Remember (1)
Deep Purple (2)
Lana Del Rey (4)
John Denver (1)
Def Leppard (2)
Deftones (1)
Neil Diamond (6)
Dido (2)
Diesel (2)
Dire Straits (4)
Disturbed (2)
Celine Dion (5)
Drake (4)
Drapht (1)
Dr. Dre (1)
Dr. Hook & The Medicine Show (1)
Duran Duran (1)
Bob Dylan (4)
Dune Rats (2)

E

Eagles (3)
Karise Eden (1) 
Billie Eilish (2)
Electric Light Orchestra (3)
Eminem (10)
Enya (1)
Eskimo Joe (2)
Gloria Estefan (1)
Eurythmics (2)
Evanescence (2)

F

Faith No More (1)
Chet Faker (1)
Bernard Fanning (2)
John Farnham (10)
Fergie (1)
Bryan Ferry (1) 
Billy Field (1)
Ruby Fields (1)
Neil Finn (1)
Fleetwood Mac (1)
Florence and the Machine (2)
Flume (2)
Foals (1)
Foo Fighters (8)
Foster the People (1)
The Fray (1)
Sia (2)
Future (1)

G

Lady Gaga (4)
Gang of Youths (2)
Garbage (1)
George (1)
Barry Gibb (1)
Glee Cast (2)
Selena Gomez (1)
Ariana Grande (4)
Macy Gray (1)
Delta Goodrem (5)
Good Charlotte (2)
Kenny G (1)
Gotye (1)
Gorillaz (1)
Ariana Grande (1)
Green Day (3)
Guns N' Roses (2) 
Gyroscope (1)

H

Hanson (1)
George Harrison (1)
Ben Harper (1)
Luke Hemmings (1)
Taylor Henderson (2)
Jimi Hendrix (1)
Hermitude (1)
Missy Higgins (3)
Hillsong Church (1)
Hillsong United (2)
Hillsong Worship (1)
Hilltop Hoods (6)
Hinder (1)
James Horner (1)
Hothouse Flowers (1)
Whitney Houston (2)
Human Nature (3)
Huskii (1)

I

Ian Moss (1)
Icehouse (1)
Enrique Iglesias (1)
Il Divo (2)
Illy (2)
Natalie Imbruglia (1)
Dami Im (1)
INXS (4)
Chris Isaak (1)

J

Janet Jackson (2)
Michael Jackson (6)
Jack Johnson (4)
Jamiroquai (2)
Jet (1)
Jive Bunny and the Mastermixers (1) 
Billy Joel (4)
Elton John (6)
Daniel Johns (1)
The John Butler Trio (3)
Norah Jones (1)
Rickie Lee Jones (1)
Joji (1)
Janis Joplin (1)
Juice Wrld (1)
The Jungle Giants (1)

K

Karnivool (1)
Ronan Keating (1)
Machine Gun Kelly (1)
Paul Kelly (4)
Lee Kernaghan (1)
The Kid Laroi (1)
The Killers (3)
Killing Heidi (1)
Kings of Leon (4)
Kiss (1)
The Knack (1)
Beyoncé (3)
Korn (3)
Lenny Kravitz (1)

L

Cyndi Lauper (1)
Led Zeppelin (4)
Kendrick Lamar (2)
k.d. lang (2)
Avril Lavigne (3)
Damien Leith (1)
John Lennon (3)
Dean Lewis (1)
Leona Lewis (1)
Lil Nas X (1)
Lil Uzi Vert (1)
Lime Cordiale (1)
Linkin Park (3)
Dua Lipa (1)
Live (3)
The Living End (2)
London Grammar (1)
Lukas Graham (1)
Lorde (3)
Mirusia Louwerse (1)

M

Meg Mac (1)
The Madden Brothers (1)
Madonna (12)
Zayn (1)
Post Malone (2)
Maroon 5 (1)
Marilyn Manson (2)
Bruno Mars (1)
Ricky Martin (1)
Richard Marx (1)
Massive Attack (1)
Matchbox Twenty (4)
John Mayer (2)
Jessica Mauboy (2)
Paul Mauriat (1)
Paul McCartney (2)
Don McLean (1)
Meat Loaf (2)
John Cougar Mellencamp (1)
Men at Work (2)
Shawn Mendes (1)
Metallica (7)
George Michael (1)
Bette Midler (1)
Midnight Oil (6)
Milli Vanilli (1)
Kylie Minogue (7)
MKTO (1)
Moby (2)
Alanis Morissette (2)
Van Morrison (1) 
Motor Ace (1)
Moving Pictures (1)
Pete Murray (3)
Mumford & Sons (2)
Muse (4)

N

Olivia Newton-John (5)
Shane Nicholson (1)
Nick Cave & the Bad Seeds (2)
Nickelback (1)
Nirvana (3)
Noiseworks (1)
Northlane (2)
Shannon Noll (2)

O

Oasis (2)
Sinéad O'Connor (1)
Frank Ocean (1)
Of Monsters and Men (1)
The Offspring (2)
Mike Oldfield (1)
One Direction (4)
Original Broadway Cast (1)
Yoko Ono (1)
Roy Orbison (1)

P

Panic! at the Disco (2)
Pantera (1)
Paramore (3)
Parkway Drive (3)
Passenger (1)
Paul Potts (1)
Paul Simon (1)
Katy Perry (2)
Pearl Jam (8)
Pink (7)
Pink Floyd (4)
The Police (4)
Pop Smoke (1)
Powderfinger (5)
The Presets (1)
Elvis Presley (2)
Prince (1)
The Prodigy (1)

Q

Suzi Quatro (1)
Queen (2)
Queen + Adam Lambert (1)
Queens of the Stone Age (2)

R

Ratcat (1)
Red Hot Chili Peppers (7)
R.E.M. (1)
Cliff Richard (2)
Lionel Richie (2)
André Rieu (1)
Olivia Rodrigo (1)
Rodney Rude (1)
The Rolling Stones (7)
Linda Ronstadt (1)
Roxy Music (1)
The Rubens (1)
RÜFÜS (3)

S

Sam Smith (2)
Santana (2)
Savage Garden (2)
Leo Sayer (1)
Boz Scaggs (1)
Scissor Sisters (1)
Travis Scott (1)
Guy Sebastian (3)
The Seekers (1)
Bob Seger (1)
Conrad Sewell (1)
Shakira (1)
Amy Shark (2)
Sherbet (2)
Sheppard (1)
Ed Sheeran (5)
Vonda Shepard (1)
Silverchair (5)
Carly Simon (1)
Simon & Garfunkel (2)
Simple Minds (1)
Troye Sivan (1)
Skegss (1)
Skyhooks (2)
Slade (1)
Slipknot (4)
The Smashing Pumpkins (2)
The Smith Street Band (1)
Sneaky Sound System (1)
Snow Patrol (1)
Something for Kate (2)
Soundgarden (2)
Spacey Jane (1)
Britney Spears (1)
Spice Girls (1)
Spin Doctors (1)
Split Enz (3)
Bruce Springsteen (5)
Stars on 45 (1)
Cat Stevens (2)
Stevie Nicks (1)
Sticky Fingers (1)
Sting (1)
Short Stack (1)
Gwen Stefani (1)
Rod Stewart (7)
Angus & Julia Stone (2)
Stone Temple Pilots (1)
Barbra Streisand (3)
The Strokes (1)
Harry Styles (3)
Taylor Swift (9)
Tash Sultana (1)
Supertramp (1)
SZA (1)
System of a Down (1)

T

Tame Impala (2)
Taxiride (1)
The Temper Trap (2)
The Teskey Brothers (1)
Rob Thomas (1)
Justin Timberlake (2)
Timbaland (1)
Tones And I (1)
Tool (3)
Toto (1)
Meghan Trainor (1)
Traveling Wilburys (1)
Jethro Tull (1)
Shania Twain (3)
Twenty One Pilots (1)

U

U2 (11)
UB40 (1)
Keith Urban (4)
Usher (1)

V

Vance Joy (2)
Vika & Linda (1)
Violent Soho (2)
Village People (1)

W

The Waifs (1)
Anthony Warlow (1)
John Wayne (1)
Andrew Lloyd Webber (1)
The Weeknd (4)
Kanye West (4)
Westlife (1)
Wet Leg (1)
Wham! (1)
The Whitlams (1)
The Wiggles (1)
Pharrell Williams (1)
Robbie Williams (5)
John Williamson (1)
Wings (2)

X

Charli XCX (1)
The xx (1)

Y
You Am I (3)
Yungblud (1)
Geoffrey Gurrumul Yunupingu (1)

See also

Music of Australia

External links
ARIA Official Website

References

Australian Record Industry Association (ARIA) official site
OzNet Music Chart

Australian Album chart
Artists who reached number one on the Australian Album hart